Pedro Teotónio Pereira (Lisbon, Mártires, 7 November 1902 – Lisbon, 14 February 1972) was a Portuguese politician and diplomat. He played a decisive role for the Allies, in drawing Spain with Portugal into a neutral peninsular bloc during World War II.

Background
He was a son of João Teotónio Pereira, Jr. (Lisbon, 1869 - Lisbon, São Domingos de Benfica, 1948), administrator of the Companhia de Seguros Fidelidade, and wife Virgínia Hermann von Boetischer (Lisbon, Santa Engrácia, 1871 - Lisbon, 1969), paternal grandson of João Teotónio Pereira (1832–1916) and wife Clara Sobral (1840 - Freixo de Espada à Cinta, Fornos, 1910) and maternal grandson of the Prussian Maximilian August Hermann von Boetischer, an engineer, linked to the installation of the telephones in Portugal, and wife Maria José da Silva. His older brother Luís Teotónio Pereira was also a politician.

Early career
Teotónio Pereira, graduated in Mathematics by the University of Lisbon. After his graduation, with the aim of following his family tradition in the insurance business, he made post-graduation studies in the actuarial science in Switzerland.

In his youth we was an active member of the Lusitanian Integralism and very close to António Sardinha.

His expertise in life insurance and actuarial science caused him to be called by Salazar to reform the Portuguese social security system. At the end of World War I, a new legislation on compulsory social insurance had been introduced in Portugal, but the lack of scientific studies caused the outcome of the experience of the Portuguese first Republic to be weak. Together with Salazar, Teotónio Pereira launched new legislation and established the foundations of the Portuguese Social Security system under the Estado Novo.

He was one of the main builders of the corporativist politics of the Portuguese Estado Novo dictatorship. He served as Sub-Secretary of State of Corporations and Social Welfare, reporting directly to Salazar, and he enacted extensive legislation that shaped the corporatist structure and initiated a comprehensive social welfare system. This system was equally anti-capitalist and anti-socialist. The corporatisation of the working class was accompanied by strict legislation regulating business. Workers' organisations were subordinated to state control, but granted a legitimacy that they had never before enjoyed and were made beneficiaries of a variety of new social programs. Nevertheless, even in the enthusiastic early years, corporatist agencies were not at the centre of power and therefore corporatism was not the true base of the whole system.

He also served as Minister of Commerce and Industry (1936–1937).

Unlike Britain, Portugal supported Franco from the outset. In January 1938, Teotónio Pereira was appointed by António de Oliveira Salazar Special Agent of Portuguese government near Francisco Franco's government during the Spanish Civil War and achieved immense prestige and influence. Later, in April 1938, he officially become Portuguese Ambassador to Spain, where he remained throughout World War II.

Following Salazar's policies Teotónio Pereira supported Franco from the very beginning but assumed the complicated role of fighting the influence of both Italians and Germans.

World War II
The prestige and the influence that he gained with the Spanish authorities proved to be of great support to allies during World War II. His role as ambassador the war has been praised both by scholars and his fellow ambassadors. Scholars have used adjectives like brilliant,  shrewd and observant  and Samuel Hoare, 1st Viscount Templewood, the British ambassador in Madrid from 1940 to 1944, described in his book "Ambassador on Special Mission" Teotónio Pereira as an ally and a man of "outstanding ability and distinction". Hoare wrote that Teotónio Pereira gave him his help and friendship from the day of Hoare's arrival to Madrid in May 1940. The testimonial's from Carlton Hayes and Samuel Hoare would later become very useful to Theotonio Pereira, when while he was placed as ambassador in Brazil and was unduly accused by the press of having been close to the Nazi's.

Among other things, Teotónio Pereira, shared with  Salazar a profound attachment to the historic Anglo-Portuguese alliance, and during the war years in Madrid, Teotónio Pereira proved himself a good friend of Britain. Mr. Carlton Hayes, then his American colleague in the diplomatic corps wrote of him in his book, Wartime Mission in Spain: "His strong patriotism was at all times evident as was also his loyalty to the historic Anglo-Portuguese alliance. He recognized, as fully as we did, the danger both to Portugal and to the Allied cause in any Axis intervention in Spain or in any unneutral collaboration of Spain with the Axis. Though he distrusted Serrano Súñer and heartily disliked the Falange, his long and close association with other influential advisers of General Franco and with large segments of the Spanish people stood us, as well as himself, in good stead.... In his constant endeavor to draw Spain with Portugal into a really neutral Peninsular bloc, he contributed immeasurably, at a time when the British and ourselves had much less influence, toward counteracting the propaganda and pleas of our enemies".

Later in the same book, Hayes wrote of a "prodigious number of refugees", who began pouring into Spain in November and December 1942. Most were Frenchmen, half starved, without money or clothes, and Hayes wrote of the decisive intervention of Teotónio Pereira in favour of 16,000 refugees  French military refugees who were trying in 1943 to get from Spain to North Africa in order there to join the Allied forces. In that group were also include Polish, Dutch and Belgian most of whom were soldiers or would-be soldiers. According to Hayes, the Poles in particular were destined to perform brilliant feats in the later Italian campaign.

In July 1945 he was awarded the Grand Cross of the Spanish Order of Charles III, the most distinguished civil award that can be granted in Spain, restricted to 100 Spanish citizens and very seldom awarded to foreigners.

He considered himself a "faithful servant of Salazar" and is remembered as one of the main accusers of Aristides de Sousa Mendes.

Later career
He later became Portuguese ambassador in Brazil (1945–47), ambassador in Washington (1947–50), Ambassador to the Court of St. James, London (1953–58) and again in Washington (1961–63).

When Teotónio Pereira was named the Portuguese ambassador to Washington, there were protests from members of the Portuguese-American community, who considered him to be an "extreme nationalist.".

As Portugal’s plenipotentiary in Washington he co-signed with President Truman, on 24 August 1949, the document implementing the North Atlantic Treaty.

He was board member of the Calouste Gulbenkian Foundation.

While ambassador in Washington, in 1963, he was diagnosed with Parkinson's disease which forced him to request an early retirement.

When Salazar became unable to govern, the President of the Republic, Américo Thomaz, who had the constitutional competence to choose a replacement, thought that Theotónio Pereira would have been “the most suitable personality to succeed Dr. Salazar, if his health had allowed it", as he wrote in his memoirs.

Sailing enthusiast and founder of Tall Ships' Races 

In 1951, while he was ambassador in Washington, Teotónio Pereira invited the Australian Navy official Alan Villiers to get on board  of the schooner Argus, a fine cod fishing four-masted schooner, and to record the last commercial activity ever to make use of sails in ocean-crossings. Villiers ended up publishing a book, "The Quest Of The Schooner Argus: A voyage to the Grand Banks and Grenland on a modern four masted fishing schooner". The book was a great success in North America and Europe and was later published in sixteen languages. The Quest of the Schooner Argus made news on the BBC, in the main London newspapers, the National Geographic Magazine, and the New York Times.

In 1953, Teotónio Pereira, together with Bernard Morgan, inspired by the idea of  bringing young cadets and seamen under training together from around the world to compete in a friendly competition, organized the first edition of the Tall Ships' Races that took place in 1956 from Torbay – south of England – to Lisbon.

It was also due to the perseverant mediation of Teotónio Pereira that, in 1961, Portugal bought the Sagres the school ship of the Portuguese Navy.

Marriage and children
He married Isabel Maria van Zeller Pereira Palha (Lisbon, Santa Engrácia, 26 October 1903 –), daughter of Constantino Nicolau Pereira Palha and wife and cousin Maria do Patrocínio Pereira Palha van Zeller, of a family of large landowners, and they had three children.

Published works

Explanatory notes

Sources
 Almeida, Joao Miguel, "Correspondência política entre Oliveira Salazar e Pedro Teotónio Pereira (1945-1968)"- Círculo de Leitores : Temas e Debates : Instituto de História Contemporânea, 2008,

References

External links
 Pedro Teotónio Pereira's genealogy in a Portuguese Genealogical site

Portuguese diplomats
1902 births
1972 deaths
Government ministers of Portugal
People from Lisbon
Portuguese people of German descent
University of Lisbon alumni
Ambassadors of Portugal to Spain
Ambassadors of Portugal to Brazil
Ambassadors of Portugal to the United States
Ambassadors of Portugal to the United Kingdom